"Desdemona" is a song by the English cult band John's Children. The song was composed by Marc Bolan, who at the time was a member of John's Children.

It was released in 1967 and failed to chart in Britain, possibly due to the fact it was banned by the BBC for the controversial lyric "lift up your skirt and fly." However, the song was a minor hit in Europe.

It was later covered by Radio Stars (featuring former John's Children singer Andy Ellison) (1978), Marsha Hunt (1969) and The Jam were known to have played the song live.

External links
 Marc Bolan fan site The text of "Desdemona" can be found under the button ‘lyrics’.

References

1967 singles
Songs written by Marc Bolan
Track Records singles
1967 songs
Obscenity controversies in music
Polydor Records singles
Songs banned by the BBC